Sanfins may refer to:

Places

Portugal
 Sanfins (Chaves), a civil parish in Chaves Municipality, Portugal;
 Sanfins (Santa Maria da Feira), a civil parish in the municipality of Santa Maria da Feira;
 Sanfins (Valença), a civil parish in the municipality of Valença;
 Sanfins (Valpaços), a civil parish in Valpaços Municipality;
 Sanfins de Ferreira, a civil parish in the municipality of Paços de Ferreira;
 Sanfins do Douro, a civil parish in Alijó Municipality;
 Sanfins (Cinfães), a civil parish in Cinfães Municipality.